Djurgården IF Hockey Dam are a professional ice hockey club in the Swedish Women's Hockey League (SDHL). They play in Stockholm at Hovet. The team is a section within the Djurgårdens IF multi-sport organization and are affiliated with its many other teams.

History   
In March 2014, the Djurgårdens IF organisation announced its intention to form a women's ice hockey section, with Danijela Rundqvist in charge of recruitment and Jared Cipparone serving as head coach. The following year, the organisation took over the Segeltorps IF women's ice hockey club following its financial difficulties and relegation from Riksserien. After just one year under the Djurgården name in Damettan, during which the club made several big signings, including Valentina Lizana Wallner and Tina Enström, the club won promotion back to the top flight, defeating Södertälje 6–1 in the qualification playoffs. 

On 9 September 2015, Djurgården played its first Riksserien match, with Andrea Schjelderup Dalen scoring the team's first Riksserien goal in a 5–1 loss to Linköping HC. The team's first Riksserien victory would come four days later, 5–2 against HV71. On 19 September 2015, the club played its first Riksserien match at home, beating Brynäs IF 5–3 in front of 834 spectators. The club finished the 2015–16 season in 4th place in the SDHL, losing to Linköping in the playoff semifinals, as Andrea Schjelderup Dalen set a single-season SDHL record for goals, with 47. 

The club finished in second place in the SDHL in the 2016–17 season, the club's best regular season result to date. In the playoffs, the club made it to the finals against HV71, where they would win their first SDHL championship. That season, the club also participated in the first SDHL Winter Classic against IF Sundsvall Hockey. After the season, club founders Danijela Rundqvist and Nils Ekman left the club.

In August 2017, the club hosted the Minnesota Whitecaps during a series of exhibition games against SDHL teams in Stockholm.

During the 2018–19 season, second-highest all-time scorer in club history Hanna Olsson criticised the organisation's supporter club, Järnkaminerna, for not doing enough to support the women's side, despite the club supposedly having the best supporters in Sweden. In January 2019, she left the club on bad terms after conflict with the coach and the club's refusal to immediately let her sign a new contract with another SDHL club. The club would finish the season in 6th place, the worst regular season result in its history, and failed to advance past the playoff quarterfinals for the first time.

The club would improve in the 2019–20 season, finishing in 4th and being elimated by HV71 in the semi-finals. After the season, head coach Alana Blahoski, as well as Canadian players Jennifer Wakefield and Samantha Ridgewell announced they were leaving the club.

Season-by-season record 
''This is a partial list of the most recent seasons completed by Djurgården.

Code explanation: Finish = Rank at end of regular season; GP = Games played, W = Wins (3 points), OTW = Overtime wins (2 points), OTL = Overtime losses (1 point), L = Losses, GF = Goals for, GA = Goals against, Pts = Points, Top scorer: Points (Goals+Assists)

Players and personnel

2022–23 roster 

Coaching staff and team personnel
 Head coach: Rickard Hårdstam
 Assistant coach: Fredrik Svensson
 Goaltending coach: Erik Ladhe
 Conditioning coach: Kim Loke
 Equipment manager: Tomas Rydgren
 Physical therapist: Ellinor Hapaanen

Team captaincy history 
 Alexandra Cipparone , 2015–2017
 Andrea Dalen, 2018–2020
 Andrea Dalen & Wilma Germundsson Wäng, 2020–21
 Josefine Holmgren, 2022–

Head coaches 
 Jared Cipparone, 2014–2017
 Roger Öhman, 2017–18
 Alana Blahoski, 2018–2020
 Rickard Hårdstam, 2020–

Franchise records and leaders

All-time scoring leaders 
The top-ten point scorers (goals + assists) of Djurgårdens IF, through the conclusion of the 2021–22 season.

Note: Nat = Nationality; Pos = Position; GP = Games played; G = Goals; A = Assists; Pts = Points; P/G = Points per game;  = 2022–23 Djurgårdens IF player

References

External links 
Djurgårdens IF Hockey – Official site 
 Team information and statistics from Eliteprospects.com and Eurohockey.com

Swedish Women's Hockey League teams
Ice hockey teams in Sweden
Women's ice hockey teams in Europe
Ice hockey teams in Stockholm
Ice hockey teams in Stockholm County